Ceyuan Township is a rural township in Yanling County, Zhuzhou City, Hunan Province, People's Republic of China. It is divided into 11 villages: Shangdong Village, Liangqiao Village, Xiaping Village, Pinghu Village, Rongtang Village, Changxing Village, Daokeng Village, Zhuyuan Village, Dongling Village, Huangcao Village, and Lishuzhou Village.

References

External links

Divisions of Yanling County